Beck Grove is a former plantation which is the location of a few houses on the island of Saint Croix in the United States Virgin Islands.

History
 

Jens Michelsen Beck (17211791) settled on Saint Croix in 1742 and was employed by the Danish West India Company. as chief surveyor for the island. He created the first town plan for the city of Frederiksted as well as one of the most frequently reproduced historical maps of Saint Croix. 

In 1750, he invested in plantation land on the western part of the island, establishing Beck's Gvrpve. In 1754, Beck returned to Denmark, leaving the management of Beck's Grove in the hands of tan over seer, Adam Søbøtker. Beck's son Michael returned to the island to take over the plantation but died shortly thereafter in a hurricane which destroyed many of the buildings, crops and forest. In 1787, Beck decided to sell the estate.

References

Populated places in Saint Croix, U.S. Virgin Islands